Lauri Allan Törni (28 May 1919 – 18 October 1965), later known as Larry Alan Thorne, was a Finnish-born soldier who fought under three flags: as a Finnish Army officer in the Winter War and the Continuation War ultimately gaining a rank of captain; as a Waffen-SS captain (under the alias Larry Laine) of the Finnish Volunteer Battalion of the Waffen-SS when he fought the Red Army on the Eastern Front in World War II; and as a United States Army Major (under the alias "Larry Thorne") when he served in the U.S. Army Special Forces in the Vietnam War.

Törni died in a helicopter crash during the Vietnam War and he was promoted to the rank of major posthumously. His remains were located three decades later and then buried in Arlington National Cemetery; he is the only former member of the Waffen-SS known to be interred there.

Early life and education
Christened Lauri Allan Törni, he was born in Viipuri, Viipuri Province, Finland, to ship captain Jalmari (Ilmari) Törni, and his wife, Rosa (née Kosonen). He had two sisters: Salme Kyllikki (b. 1920) and Kaija Iris (b. 1922). An athletic youth, Törni was an early friend of future Olympic Boxing Gold Medalist Sten Suvio. After attending business school and serving with the Civil Guard, Törni entered military service in 1938, joining Jaeger Battalion 4 stationed at Kiviniemi; when the Winter War began in November 1939, his enlistment was extended and his unit confronted invading Soviet troops at Rautu.

Career

World War II

During the battles at Lake Ladoga, Törni took part in the destruction of the encircled Soviet divisions in Lemetti.

His performance during these engagements was noticed by his commanders, and toward the end of the war, he was assigned to officer training where he was commissioned a Vänrikki (2nd lieutenant) in the reserves. After the Winter War, in June 1941, Törni went to Vienna, Austria for seven weeks of training with the Waffen-SS, and returned to Finland in July; as a Finnish officer, the Germans recognized him as an Untersturmführer.
Most of Törni's reputation was based on his successful actions in the Continuation War (1941–44) between the Soviet Union and Finland. In 1943, a unit informally named Detachment Törni was created under his command. This was an infantry unit that penetrated deep behind enemy lines and soon enjoyed a reputation on both sides of the front for its combat effectiveness. One of Törni's subordinates was future President of Finland Mauno Koivisto. Koivisto served in a reconnaissance company under Törni's command during the Battle of Ilomantsi, the final Finnish-Soviet engagement of the Continuation War, during July and August 1944. Törni's unit inflicted such heavy casualties on Soviet units that the Soviet Army placed a bounty of 3,000,000 Finnish marks on his head. He was decorated with the Mannerheim Cross 2nd Class on 9 July 1944.

The September 1944 Moscow Armistice required the Finnish government to remove German troops from its territory, resulting in the Lapland War; during this period, much of the Finnish Army was demobilized, including Törni, leaving him unemployed in November 1944. In January 1945, he was recruited by the Pro-German resistance movement in Finland and left for saboteur training in Germany, with the intention of organizing resistance in case Finland was occupied by the Soviet Union. The training was prematurely ended in March, but as Törni could not secure transportation to Finland, he joined a German unit to fight Soviet troops near Schwerin, Germany. He surrendered to British troops in the last stages of World War II and eventually returned to Finland in June 1945 after escaping a British POW camp in Lübeck, Germany.

As his family had been evacuated from Karelia, Törni sought to rejoin them in Helsinki but was arrested by Valpo, the Finnish state police. After escaping, he was arrested a second time in April 1946, and tried for treason for having joined the German military. A trial in October and November resulted in a six-year sentence in January 1947. Imprisoned at the Turku provincial prison, Törni escaped in June, but was recaptured and sent to the Riihimäki State Prison. President Juho Paasikivi granted him a pardon in December 1948.

Emigration to the United States
In 1949, Törni, accompanied by his wartime executive officer Holger Pitkänen, traveled to Sweden, crossing the border from Tornio to Haparanda (Haaparanta), where many inhabitants are ethnic Finns. From Haparanda, Törni traveled by railroad to Stockholm where he stayed with Baroness von Essen, who harbored many fugitive Finnish officers following the war. Pitkänen was arrested and repatriated to Finland. In Sweden, Törni fell in love with a Swedish Finn, Marja Kops, and was soon engaged to be married. In order to secure employment, Törni traveled under an alias as a Swedish seaman aboard the SS Bolivia, destined for Caracas, Venezuela, where he met one of his Winter War commanders, the Finnish colonel Matti Aarnio, who was in exile in Venezuela after the war. Törni hired on to a Swedish cargo ship, the MS Skagen, which traveled from Caracas for the United States in 1950.

While in the Gulf of Mexico, near Mobile, Alabama, Törni jumped overboard and swam to shore. Now a political refugee, Törni traveled to New York City where he was helped by the Finnish-American community living in Brooklyn's Sunset Park "Finntown". There he worked as a carpenter and cleaner. In 1953, Törni was granted a residence permit through an Act of Congress that was shepherded by the law firm of "Wild Bill" Donovan, former head of the Office of Strategic Services.

United States Army
Törni enlisted in the US Army in 1954 under the provisions of the Lodge-Philbin Act and adopted the name Larry Thorne. In the US Army, he was befriended by a group of Finnish-American officers who came to be known as "Marttinen's Men" (Marttisen miehet).

With their support, Thorne joined the US Army Special Forces. While in the Special Forces, he taught skiing, survival, mountaineering, and guerrilla tactics. In turn he attended airborne school, and advanced in rank to sergeant. Receiving his US citizenship in 1957, Thorne attended Officer Candidate School, and was commissioned as a first lieutenant in the Signal Corps. He later received a Regular Army commission and a promotion to captain in 1960. From 1958–1962, he served in the 10th Special Forces Group in West Germany at Bad Tölz, from where he was second-in-command of a search and recovery mission high in the Zagros Mountains of Iran, which gained him a notable reputation. When he was in Germany, he briefly visited his relatives in Finland. In an episode of The Big Picture released in 1962 and composed of footage filmed in 1959, Thorne is shown as a lieutenant with the 10th Special Forces Group in the United States Army.

Vietnam War
Deploying to South Vietnam in November 1963 to support Army of the Republic of Vietnam (ARVN) forces in the Vietnam War, Thorne and Special Forces Detachment A-734 were stationed in the Tịnh Biên District and assigned to operate Civilian Irregular Defense Group (CIDG) encampments at Châu Lăng and later Tịnh Biên.

During a fierce attack on the CIDG camp in Tịnh Biên, he received two Purple Hearts and a Bronze Star Medal for valor during the battle.

Thorne's second tour in Vietnam began in February 1965 with 5th Special Forces Group; he then transferred to Military Assistance Command, Vietnam – Studies and Observations Group (MACV–SOG), a classified US special operations unit focusing on unconventional warfare in Vietnam, as a military advisor.

On 18 October 1965, as part of the operation Shining Brass, Thorne was supervising the first clandestine mission to locate Viet Cong turnaround points along the Ho Chi Minh trail and destroy them with airstrikes. Two Republic of Vietnam Air Force (RVNAF) CH-34 helicopters launched from Kham Duc Special Forces Camp and rendezvoused with a United States Air Force Cessna O-1 Bird Dog Forward Air Controller in inclement weather in a mountainous area of Phước Sơn District, Quảng Nam Province, Vietnam,  from Da Nang. While one CH-34 descended through a gap in the weather to drop off the six-man team, the command CH-34 carrying Thorne and the O-1 loitered nearby. When the drop helicopter returned above the cloud cover, both the CH-34 and the O-1 had disappeared. Rescue teams were unable to locate the crash site. Shortly after his disappearance, Thorne was promoted to the rank of major and posthumously awarded the Legion of Merit and Distinguished Flying Cross.

In 1999, Thorne's remains were found by a Finnish and Joint Task Force-Full Accounting team and repatriated to the United States following a Hanoi Noi Bai International Airport ceremony that included Secretary of State Madeleine Albright and Ambassador Pete Peterson.

Formally identified in 2003, his remains were buried on 26 June 2003 at Arlington National Cemetery, along with the RVNAF casualties of the mission recovered at the crash site. He was memorialized on the Vietnam Veterans Memorial at Panel 02E, Line 126. He was survived only by his fiancée, Marja Kops.

Military awards
Finnish decorations
  2nd class Medal of Liberty, 26 July 1940
  1st class Medal of Liberty, 24 August 1940
  3rd class Cross of Liberty, 9 October 1941
  4th class Cross of Liberty, 23 May 1942
  2nd class Mannerheim Cross, 9 July 1944
 1st Div. Memorial Cross
 Border Jaeger Troops Cross
 Defense Forces Bronze Medal

German decoration
  Iron Cross, 2nd class, 11 December 1943

United States Army

Badges
   Combat Infantryman Badge
   Master Parachutist Badge
  Silver German Parachutist Badge
   Special Forces Tab
  Army Special Forces CSIB
Decorations and medals
  Legion of Merit (posthumous)
  Distinguished Flying Cross (posthumous)
  Bronze Star Medal with "V" device
  Purple Heart with oak leaf cluster
  Air Medal
  Army Commendation Medal
  Good Conduct Medal
  National Defense Service Medal with star
  Vietnam Service Medal with two campaign stars
  Republic of Vietnam Campaign Medal

Distinguished Flying Cross citation

Citation:

The President of the United States of America, authorized by Act of Congress, July 2, 1926, takes pride in presenting the Distinguished Flying Cross (Posthumously) to Major (Infantry), (then Captain) Larry Alan Thorne (ASN: 0-2287104), United States Army, for heroism while participating in aerial flight on 18 October 1965 in the Republic of Vietnam. Major Thorne was operations officer responsible for launching a small, combined reconnaissance patrol on an extremely hazardous mission into a suspected Viet Cong stronghold. Due to the extreme hazards attending this mission, including weather and enemy action, Major Thorne volunteered to accompany submission aircraft during the introduction of the patrol in place of the assigned individual. After delivering the patrol to the landing zone, Major Thorne remained with one aircraft in the immediate area to receive an initial report from the patrol on the ground. This report was mandatory since only the vaguest information was available about enemy disposition near the landing zone. If the patrol were immediately confronted by a superior force, Major Thorne would land and extricate the patrol under fire. This was done with total disregard for the inherent dangers and with selfless concern for the ground forces. In so doing, he exposed himself to extreme personal danger which ultimately led to his disappearance and the loss of his aircraft. He had, however, guaranteed the safe introduction of the patrol into the area, the successful accomplishment of this mission and had positioned himself to react to any immediate calls for assistance from the patrol. Due to Major Thorne's efforts, the mission was accomplished successfully and contributed significantly to the overall mission of interdicting Viet Cong activities within the area. Major Thorne's actions were in keeping with the highest traditions of the military service, and reflect great credit upon himself and the United States Army.

General Orders: Department of the Army, General Orders No. 33 (July 26, 1967)

Action Date: October 18, 1965

Dates of rank

Finnish Army
 3 September 1938, Conscript (reserves)
 1 March 1939, Lance Corporal (reserves)
 9 May 1940, Second Lieutenant (reserves)
 5 March 1942, Lieutenant (reserves)
 27 August 1944, Captain (reserves)
 6 October 1950, removed from officers list

German Waffen-SS
 18 May 1941, Untersturmführer (Nordost)
 15 April 1945, Hauptsturmführer (Sonderkommando Nord)

United States Army
 Private – 28 January 1954
 Private First Class – 20 December 1954
 Corporal – 28 April 1955
 Sergeant – 17 November 1955
 1st Lieutenant, USAR – 9 January 1957
 Captain, USAR – 30 November 1960
 Major, USAR (posthumous) – 16 December 1965

Commemoration
In the 1965 book The Green Berets by Robin Moore, the "Sven Kornie" (or Captain Steve Kornie) main character in the first chapter was based on Thorne.

In the 1990s, Törni's name became better known, with numerous books being written about him. He was named 52nd in the Suuret Suomalaiset listing of famous Finns; in the 2006 Suomen Sotilas (Soldier of Finland) magazine listing, he was elected most courageous of the Mannerheim Cross recipients.

In Finland, the survivors, friends, and families of Detachment Törni formed the Lauri Törni Tradition Guild. The Infantry Museum (Jalkaväkimuseo) in Mikkeli, Finland, has an exhibit dedicated to Törni, as does the Military Museum of Finland in Helsinki.

Even before his death, Thorne's name was legendary in US Special Forces. His US memorial is the Larry Thorne Headquarters Building, 10th SFG(A), Fort Carson, Colorado. 10th Group honors him yearly by presenting the Larry Thorne Award to the best Operational Detachment-Alpha in the command. The Special Forces Association Chapter 33 in Cleveland, Tennessee is named after him.

In 2010 he was named as the first Honorary Member of the United States Army Special Forces Regiment and in 2011 he was inducted into the United States Special Operations Command (USSOCOM) Commando Hall of Honor.

In their 2013 book Tuntematon Lauri Törni [Unknown Lauri Törni], authors Juha Pohjonen and Oula Silvennoinen write that Törni's conviction for treason was justified because the SS training he received at the end of World War II was provided to help achieve a National Socialist coup in Finland. This view has been challenged by Törni Heritage Guild members Markku Moberg and Pasi Niittymäki, who acknowledge that Törni faced pressure from the war and alcohol consumption, but contend that he did not support Germany. Furthermore, Finnish historian and later Minister of Defence (2015–2019) Jussi Niinistö of the right-wing populist Finns Party argued that Törni's training was actually motivated by patriotism towards his native country, and accused Pohjonen and Silvennoinen of stirring up hatred in order to promote sales of their book while disregarding "the fact that in Finland there was a genuine fear that Russia would occupy Finland."

See also
Alpo K. Marttinen
Aarne Juutilainen
Aimo Koivunen

Notes

Footnotes

References
 
 In 2002 as: A Scent of Glory: The Times and Life of Larry A. Thorne. Athens: Nike Ekdotike. . .
 In Swedish in 2008 as: Lauri Törni Yrke Soldat. Svenskt Militärhistoriskt Bibliotek; .

Further reading
 
 
 
 
 Reviewed in The Bugle, June 2011

External links

 "More on Larry Thorne", by J. Mike Cleverley 
 
 
 Also available as 
 

1919 births
1965 deaths
Military personnel from Vyborg
American military personnel killed in the Vietnam War
Burials at Arlington National Cemetery
Finnish soldiers
Finnish guerrillas
Finnish military personnel of World War II
Volunteers in the Winter War
Finnish Waffen-SS personnel
Finnish anti-communists
Finnish prisoners of war
World War II prisoners of war held by the United Kingdom
Finnish escapees
Finnish emigrants to the United States
People convicted of treason
Recipients of Finnish presidential pardons
Knights of the Mannerheim Cross
Recipients of the Iron Cross (1939), 2nd class
Recipients of the Distinguished Flying Cross (United States)
Recipients of the Legion of Merit
SS-Hauptsturmführer
United States Army personnel of the Vietnam War
United States Army officers
Members of the United States Army Special Forces
People from Sunset Park, Brooklyn
Finnish expatriates in Sweden
People with acquired American citizenship
Victims of aviation accidents or incidents in 1965
Victims of aviation accidents or incidents in Vietnam
Victims of helicopter accidents or incidents